The UConn Huskies football team has represented the University of Connecticut in National Collegiate Athletic Association (NCAA) football since the team's founding in 1896.  The program has had 30 head coaches, including one interim coach and an early period where the team had no head coach.  As of 2021, the current coach is Jim Mora.

The nickname "Huskies" was adopted following a student poll in The Connecticut Campus in 1934 after the school's name changed from Connecticut Agricultural College to Connecticut State College in 1933; before then, the teams were referred to as the Aggies. Although the school's abbreviated nickname "UConn" and the Canadian Yukon territory—where huskies are commonly used in dogsledding—are homophones, the "Huskies" nickname predates the school's 1939 name change to the University of Connecticut.  The first recorded use of "UConn" (as "U-Conn", both separately and with "Huskies") was later in 1939.

The Huskies have played 1,083 games during the program's 118 seasons through 2016.  UConn joined the fledgling Yankee Conference in 1947, which merged with and became the Atlantic 10 football conference in 1997.  Seven coaches—J. Orlean Christian, Robert Ingalls, John Toner, Robert Casciola, Larry Naviaux, Walt Nadzak, and Tom Jackson—led Connecticut to conference championships prior to the team's transition from Division I-AA to Division I-A in 2000, and one coach—Skip Holtz—led UConn to the Division I-AA playoffs in 1998.  Following the transition, Edsall led the Huskies to Big East Conference championships in 2007 and 2010.

Randy Edsall is Connecticut's all-time leader in games coached (144), coaching wins (74), bowl game appearances (5), and bowl game wins (3).  Bob Diaco is the only other UConn head coach to lead the team to a bowl game, which was lost.  Dave Warner, who led the then-Aggies to a 3–0 record in his only season coached in 1914, is the all-time leader in winning percentage (1.000); E. S. Mansfield and Leo Hafford, who both lost every game they coached in 1898 and 1911, respectively, share the lowest-ever winning percentage (.000).  Among coaches that led the team for longer than a single season, T. D. Knowles is the all-time leader in winning percentage (.712), while John F. Donahue has the all-time lowest winning percentage (.125).

Key

Coaches

Notes

References
General

 

Specific

UConn
UConn Huskies football coaches